Ticonderoga High School is a historic high school building located at Ticonderoga in Essex County, New York.  It was built in 1928-1930 and is a three-story, masonry neo-Georgian style building with a slate roof, concrete foundation, and brick walls.  It features a semi-circular portico with Corinthian order columns and a balustrade and a copper polygonal cupola.

It was listed on the National Register of Historic Places in 1988.

, the building is still in use as the sole public high school operated by the Ticonderoga Central School District.

Footnotes

School buildings on the National Register of Historic Places in New York (state)
Colonial Revival architecture in New York (state)
School buildings completed in 1930
Buildings and structures in Essex County, New York
Schools in Essex County, New York
Public high schools in New York (state)
National Register of Historic Places in Essex County, New York
1930 establishments in New York (state)
Educational institutions established in 1930